Rita Hayworth: The Love Goddess is a 1983 American made-for-television biographical film directed by James Goldstone. Based on the 1982 biography Rita Hayworth by John Kobal, it deals with real events in the life of actress Rita Hayworth from 1931 to 1952. It was broadcast by CBS on November 2, 1983.

Plot    
Born Rita Cansino, Rita Hayworth rises to the top of Hollywood becoming a World War II "pinup girl" next to Betty Grable and for three years she is one of the top movie actresses in the world. However, her personal life does not match her professional success. Happiness eludes her in her tumultuous relationship with tyrannical studio executive Harry Cohn, who often exploits her. She also has an unhappy marriage to Orson Welles and to Prince Aly Khan.

Cast 
Lynda Carter as Rita Hayworth
 Michael Lerner as Harry Cohn
 John Considine as Ed Judson
 Jane Hallaren	as Virginia Van Upp
 Alejandro Rey as Eduardo Cansino
 Edward Edwards as Orson Welles
 Philip Sterling as Joseph Schenck
 Ivan Bonar as Howard Hawks
 Leonard Mann as Contract Player
 James T. Callahan	as Test Director
 Julian Fellowes as Aly Khan's Chauffeur
 Rance Howard as Still Photographer

References

External links

1983 television films
1983 films
1980s English-language films
American biographical films
Films directed by James Goldstone
American television films
Films scored by Lalo Schifrin
Biographical films about actors
Films about Orson Welles
1980s American films